Deryl Dwaine Dodd (born April 12, 1964) is an American Texas country music artist. Originally a regular on the Texas club circuit, he moved to Nashville, Tennessee, soon finding work as a lead guitar player, background vocalist and songwriter. After moving to Nashville in 1991 he played lead guitar for Tracy Lawrence and Martina McBride. By 1996, he was signed to a recording contract, releasing two albums for Columbia Records Nashville before a debilitating bout of viral encephalitis put his career on hiatus.

Having recovered from his encephalitis in 2000, Dodd resumed his singing career, also touring with Tim McGraw and Faith Hill. He released a third album for Columbia in 2002, followed by two more albums for Dualtone Records. Overall, Dodd has released five studio albums and a live album, and has charted nine singles on the Billboard Hot Country Songs charts. His highest-charting single, "A Bitter End", peaked at No. 26 on the country charts and No. 88 on the Billboard Hot 100 in late 1998-early 1999.

Biography
Deryl Dodd was raised in Dallas, Texas, where he played football from an early age. After a career-ending injury, Dodd was persuaded to perform music in clubs throughout the state of Texas. In 1991, he moved to Nashville, Tennessee, forming a band along with Brett Beavers, ow an established Nashville songwriter. Dodd later found work singing harmony vocals for Martina McBride, Radney Foster, and George Ducas, in addition to playing in Tracy Lawrence's road band, and co-writing a song on Tim McGraw's All I Want album.

Dodd signed to Columbia Records in 1996 as a solo act. His first album, One Ride in Vegas, was released that year, producing a Top 40 hit on the U.S. Billboard country music charts in the Tom T. Hall-penned "That's How I Got to Memphis". One Ride in Vegas was followed by an eponymous album in 1998; that same year, Dodd was nominated as Top New Male Vocalist by the Academy of Country Music. His second album, after being delayed due to its initial lead single underperforming at radio, also produced his biggest chart hit to date in "A Bitter End", which peaked at No. 26 on the country charts.

In 1999, Dodd was diagnosed with viral encephalitis, forcing him to temporarily halt his career. He remained bedridden for six months, and then went through eighteen months of rehabilitation (which included re-learning how to play guitar). Once he had fully recovered, he attended several writers' nights in Nashville, and was later signed as an opening act on Tim McGraw and Faith Hill's Soul2Soul tour.

Dodd's third and final album for Columbia, Pearl Snaps, was released in 2002. Later, he recorded Live at Billy Bob's Texas, before switching to Dualtone Records in 2004 to release Stronger Proof (2004) and Full Circle (2006). In 2009, Dodd released a cover of "Together Again", originally a hit for Buck Owens.

Discography

Albums

Singles

Music videos

References

External links
Official website

1964 births
American country singer-songwriters
Living people
Skyline High School (Dallas) alumni
Musicians from Dallas
Columbia Records artists
Dualtone Records artists
Singer-songwriters from Texas
Country musicians from Texas